Deep Creek Hot Springs, DCHS, are natural hot springs located in the northern Mojave Desert section of the San Bernardino National Forest, near Hesperia in San Bernardino County, Southern California.

Geography
The springs are in the rain shadowed desert foothills of the San Bernardino Mountains on the Deep Creek fork of the Mojave River. They are in a large bouldered riparian zone, surrounded by a rich habitat ecotone of the xeric shrublands—desert chaparral, montane chaparral and piñon-juniper woodlands, and conifer forest plant communities.

The Southwestern Arroyo Toad—Bufo californicus, an endangered species, lives along Deep Creek.

Recreation
Deep Creek Hot Springs, being located next to Deep Creek, provides both hot and cold water locations for clothing optional bathing. The site is managed by the San Bernardino National Forest and is maintained by a volunteer group, the Deep Creek Volunteers. Water from the creek or pools is not advised for consumption. The hot pools contain a rare and sometimes fatal disease called primary amoebic meningoencephalitis. Very high fecal coliform counts are found in the hot springs as well.

Hiking Trails
There are three main hiking routes to reach the Hot Springs.

Bowen Ranch / Freedom Trail - the shortest route at approximately two miles each way.
Bradford Ridge Path - 2.6 mile one-way trip from the south.
Pacific Crest Trail - the PCT goes through Deep Creek Hot Springs and can be reached from the Lake Arrowhead area, 6 miles each way.

Regulations

The Deep Creek Hot Springs regulations include:
 Closed to the public from sundown to sunrise.
 No camping is permitted within  of Deep Creek or on Federal Land within  of a developed campground.
 Public nudity is common and permitted at the hot springs, but not permitted within 1/4 mile of 'T-6 crossing', located 6 miles upstream near Splinter's Cabin. 
 No fires campfires allowed in the Deep Creek drainage basin, gas/propane fueled stoves only.
 No glass containers permitted within  of Deep Creek.
 Pack out everything you packed in and more. Leave no trace and leave it better than you found it!
 State designated Wild Trout Stream, the Deep Creek Scenic Wild Trout Area. 
 Limit two fish. Must be eight inches (203 mm) or larger.
 Artificial Lures or Flies with barbless hooks only.

See also
 List of hot springs
 List of hot springs in the United States
 Mojave Narrows Park

References

External links
 
San Bernardino National Forest: official Deep Creek Hot Springs website
 Deep Creek Hot Springs.net Forum
 Deep Creek Hot Springs Yahoo Group forum (Yahoo login required)
 Deep Creek Volunteers
 Deep Creek Hot Springs: location photo gallery
Deep Creek Hot Springs location photos on Instagram

Hot springs of California
Bathing
Naturism in the United States
San Bernardino Mountains
Springs of San Bernardino County, California
Protected areas of the Mojave Desert
Protected areas of San Bernardino County, California
San Bernardino National Forest